Beatriz Enríquez de Arana (1465–1521?) was the mistress of Christopher Columbus and mother of Ferdinand Columbus, Columbus's natural son, whom he later officially recognized.

Biography
In Rafael Ramírez de Arellano's history of Córdoba he explains that she and her brother Peter took the name of their maternal aunt Mayor Enríquez de Arana. She was one of the relatives who took them in (with possibly Francisco Enriquez de Arana, a wine maker) when they became orphaned in 1471.

Relationship with Columbus

When Columbus died he left some provision for her in his will, directing his son Diego to hold her in respect and continue an annual allowance.  Diego appears to have been a bit remiss with payments; Beatriz'  last recorded act in 1521 was hiring an attorney to collect some money, and Diego's will written in 1532 contained a directive that any unpaid monies from the last three or four years were to be paid out to Beatriz' heirs.

Neither her cause of death, or the exact date have been recorded, but it is assumed to have taken place shortly after 1521.

Notes

References 

Brinkbäumer, Klaus, The voyage of the Vizcaína: the mystery of Christopher Columbus's last ship, Houghton Mifflin Harcourt, 2006, 
Fiske, John, The discovery of America: with some account of ancient America and the Spanish conquest, Houghton Mifflin, 1895
Patrick, James, Renaissance and Reformation, Marshall Cavendish, 2001, 
Phillips, Carla Rahn, The Worlds of Christopher Columbus, Cambridge University Press, 1993, 
Rafael Ramírez de Arellano, History of Cordova from its foundation to the death of Isabel the Catholic. Ciudad Real: Tipografía del Hospicio Provincial, 1915–1919
Thacher, John Boyd, Christopher Columbus: his life, his works, his remains: as revealed by original printed and manuscript records, together with an essay on Peter Martyr d'Anghiera and Bartolomé de las Casas, the first historians of America, G.P. Putnam's Sons, 1903
The World Book Encyclopedia, World Book Inc., 2007, ; 
Thomas, Hugh, Rivers of gold: the rise of the Spanish Empire, from Columbus to Magellan, Random House, Inc., 2004, 
Wilford, John Noble, The Mysterious History of Columbus. An Exploration of the man, the Myth, the Legacy, Alfred A. Knopf (New York) 1991, 
Young, Filson, Christopher Columbus and the New World of His Discovery, J.B. Lippincott, 1906

Further reading 

Curtis, William Eleroy, The relics of Columbus: an illustrated description of the historical collection in the monastery of La Ra, William H. Lowdermilk Company, 1893, p. 117 item 521
Davidson, Miles H., Columbus then and now, University of Oklahoma Press, 1997, pp. 152–158, 
Duro, Cesáreo Fernández, Colón Y La Historia Póstuma, BiblioBazaar, LLC, 2008, pp. 184–163, 217, 
Foster, Genevieve, The World of Columbus and Sons, Charles Scribner's Sons 1965, pp. 133–145, Library of Congress Catalog Card No. 65-18410
Markham, Clements Robert, Life of Christopher Columbus, G. Philip & Son, ltd., 1902, pp. 60–63
Ryan, Sara Agnes, Christopher Columbus in Poetry, History and Art, The Mayer and Miller company, 1917, p. 4

1465 births
1521 deaths
Beatriz
15th-century Spanish women
15th-century Castilians
16th-century Spanish women
16th-century Spanish people